Deh Baneh may refer to:
 Deh Baneh, Lahijan
 Deh Baneh, Rasht
 Deh Baneh, Siahkal

See also
 Deh Boneh (disambiguation)